Robert Lewis Delpino (born November 2, 1965) is a former professional American football running back in the National Football League (NFL). He played six seasons in the league for the Los Angeles Rams (1988–1992) and the Denver Broncos (1993). Delpino played college football at the University of Missouri and was drafted by the Rams in the fifth round of the 1988 NFL Draft.

References

1965 births
Living people
American football running backs
Denver Broncos players
Los Angeles Rams players
Missouri Tigers football players
People from Dodge City, Kansas
Players of American football from Kansas